Mário Reis may refer to:
Mário Reis (singer) (1907-1981), Brazilian samba singer
Mário Reis (footballer) (born 1947), Portuguese footballer and football manager
Mario Reis (physicist), Brazilian physicist